The Lao People's Armed Forces (LPAF), is the armed forces of the Lao People's Democratic Republic and the institution of the Lao People's Revolutionary Party, who are charged with protecting the country.

Leadership
Commander-in-chief: Thongloun Sisoulith (General Secretary and President)
Defense Minister: General Chansamone Chanyalath
Chief of General Staff: major General Khamlieng Outhakaysone

Active forces 
The army of 29,100 is equipped with 30 main battle tanks. The army marine section, equipped with 16 patrol craft, has 600 personnel. The air force, with 3,500 personnel, is equipped with anti-aircraft missiles and 24 combat aircraft (no longer in service).

Militia self-defence forces number approximately 100,000 organised for local defence. The small arms utilised mostly by the Laotian Army are the Soviet AKM assault rifle, PKM machine gun, Makarov PM pistol, and the RPD light machine gun.

History

Until 1975, the Royal Lao Armed Forces were the armed forces of the Kingdom of Laos.

Serving one of the world's least developed countries, the Lao People's Armed Forces (LPAF) is small, poorly funded, and ineffectively resourced. Its mission focus is border and internal security, primarily in internal suppression of Laotian dissident and opposition groups.

This includes the suppression of the 1999 Lao Students Movement of Democracy demonstrations in Vientiane, and in countering ethnic Hmong insurgent groups and other groups of Laotian and Hmong people opposing the one-party Marxist-Leninist LPRP government and the support it receives from the Socialist Republic of Vietnam.

Together with the Lao People's Revolutionary Party and the government, the Lao People's Army (LPA) is the third pillar of state machinery, and as such is expected to suppress political and civil unrest and similar national emergencies faced by the government in Vientiane. The LPA also has reportedly upgraded skills to respond to avian influenza outbreaks. At present, there is no major perceived external threat to the state and the LPA maintains very strong ties with the neighbouring Vietnamese military (2008).

According to some journalists, non-governmental organisations (NGOs), humanitarian and human rights organisations, the Lao People's Army has repeatedly engaged in egregious human rights violations and the practice of corruption in Laos.
The LPAF and its military intelligence play a major role in the arrest, imprisonment and torture of foreign prisoners in Vientiane's notorious Phonthong Prison and the communist Lao gulag system where Australians Kerry and Kay Danes were imprisoned and where civic activist Sombath Somphone may be imprisoned following his arrest in December 2012.

In 2013, attacks by the Lao People's Army against the Hmong people intensified, with soldiers killing four unarmed Hmong school teachers in addition to engaging in other human rights abuses according to the Lao Human Rights Council, the Centre for Public Policy Analysis and others.

Equipment

Tanks, armored vehicles and trucks

Artillery

Air defense

Weapons

Mortars
 81mm
 82mm
 120mm
  M1938 mortar
  120mm: M-43
  M2 4.2 inch mortar

See also
 Lao People's Liberation Army Air Force
 Military ranks of the Lao People's Armed Forces

References

External links 
 The AMR Regional Air Force Directory 2011

Military of Laos
Military wings of communist parties
1975 establishments in Laos

bn:লাওসের সামরিক বাহিনী